Sunshine (Swedish: Solkatten) is a 1948 Swedish drama film directed by Gösta Werner and starring Annalisa Ericson, Nils Ericsson and  Georg Funkquist. It was shot at the Imagoateljéerna Studios in the Stockholm suburb of Stocksund. The film's sets were designed by the art director Nils Nilsson.

Synopsis
Monica Granström sets out to find who amongst four possible men is her real father.

Cast
 Annalisa Ericson as 	Monica Granström
 Nils Ericsson as 	Peter Sundström
 Georg Funkquist as 	Johan Petrén
 Arnold Sjöstrand as Selim Hedberg
 Hugo Björne as 	Gustav Hellström
 Oscar Winge as 	Sven Gustafsson
 Marianne Löfgren as 	Amanda
 Einar Axelsson as 	Arvid Bjurstedt
 Hjördis Petterson as 	Klara Bjurstedt
 Åke Claesson as 	Jörgen Bure
 Jan Molander as 	Metusalem
 Naima Wifstrand as Helena
 Emmy Albiin as 	Guest in café
 Margit Andelius as 	Miss Hemlin
 Wiktor Andersson as Enockson, hotel porter
 Hilda Borgström as 	Aunt Margareta
 Christian Bratt as 	Eric Carle
 Inga Bucht as 	Waitress
 Julia Cæsar as Mrs. Råkberg
 Nils Hallberg as Demonstration participator
 Birgitta Hellerstedt as 	Anita
 Sven Melin as 	Clerk
 Saga Sjöberg as 	Guest in café

References

Bibliography 
  Cowie, Peter Françoise Buquet, Risto Pitkänen & Godfried Talboom. Scandinavian Cinema: A Survey of the Films and Film-makers of Denmark, Finland, Iceland, Norway, and Sweden. Tantivy Press, 1992.
 Qvist, Per Olov & von Bagh, Peter. Guide to the Cinema of Sweden and Finland. Greenwood Publishing Group, 2000.

External links 
 

1948 films
Swedish drama films
1948 drama films
1940s Swedish-language films
Films directed by Gösta Werner
1940s Swedish films